Daniel Sobkova (born 17 July 1985) is an Austrian footballer who currently plays as a forward for FC Schaan. Sobkova scored the winning goal in the 2013 Austrian Cup Final as Pasching defeated Austria Wien 1-0.

Honours
Pasching
Austrian Cup: 2012–13

References

External links

1985 births
Living people
Austrian footballers
SC Austria Lustenau players
FC Juniors OÖ players
SV Grödig players
LASK players
SV Ried players
SW Bregenz players
Austrian Football Bundesliga players
2. Liga (Austria) players
Austrian Regionalliga players
Association football forwards